Luch is a rural locality (a village) in Tazlarovsky Selsoviet, Zianchurinsky District, Bashkortostan, Russia. The population was 64 as of 2010. There is 1 street.

Geography 
Luch is located 12 km southeast of Isyangulovo (the district's administrative centre) by road. Ivanovka is the nearest rural locality.

References 

Rural localities in Zianchurinsky District